Daphne Olivier (October 1889 – 14 July 1950) was the third daughter of the British politician Sydney Olivier, 1st Baron Olivier, and Margaret Cox; she was the sister of Margery (1886–1974), Brynhild (1887–1935) and Noël (1893–1969) and the first cousin of the actor Laurence Olivier (1907–1989). She established the first Rudolf Steiner school in England.

Biography

Daphne studied medieval and modern languages at Newnham College, Cambridge and, together with her sisters Bryn and Noël, belonged to Rupert Brooke's social circle that Virginia Woolf named the Neo-Pagans, as well as forming part of the circle of friends of John Maynard Keynes. Upon graduating in 1913, she became a teacher. Some years later, she became interested in the anthroposophical and educational work of Rudolf Steiner, possibly attending an educational conference he held in Stuttgart in 1922, as Owen Barfield claims. That same year she met both Owen Barfield and his close friend Cecil Harwood at a concert tour of the English Folk Dance Society, where she sang and played the fiddle. It was through her that they both became acquainted with anthroposophy.<ref>Owen Barfield: Romanticism Comes of Age : A Biography - Simon Blaxland-de Lange. Temple Lodge Publishing 2006 P.91</ref>

She approached Rudolf Steiner for support in starting a Waldorf School in England, gathered a group of three other women and, on being advised by Steiner to include also a male teacher, asked her friend Harwood to join. The school, called at the time "The New School" was founded in 1925 in South London. It later moved to Forest Row in East Sussex and was renamed Michael Hall. She and Cecil Harwood were married on 14 August 1925 and the couple subsequently had five children. Besides her work as a teacher, Daphne translated a number of Steiner's works into English.

Harwood was a friend of C.S. Lewis and Owen Barfield, a fellow follower of Steiner. Lewis was a frequent visitor to the couple's home in London and became godfather to their son Laurence. She died in 1950 of cancer.

References

 Bibliography 

  (alternative title: Noble Savages. The Olivier Sisters: Four lives in seven fragments)
 Delany, Paul. The Neo-Pagans - Friendship and Love in the Rupert Brooke Circle. Macmillan. London. 1987.  (hc)
 C. S. Lewis, My Godfather: Letters, Photos and Recollections by Laurence Harwood, IVP Books 2007 
 All My Road Before Me: The Diary of C. S. Lewis, 1922-1927 by C. S. Lewis; edited by Walter Hooper, HarperCollins 1991 
 A Good School: A History of Michael Hall'' by Joy Mansfield; edited by Brien Masters and Stephen Sheen, Blue Filter 2014 

1889 births
1950 deaths
Anthroposophists
Alumni of Newnham College, Cambridge
Daughters of barons
Olivier family